Novoye is a rural locality (a selo) in Bogolyubovskoye Rural Settlement, Suzdalsky District, Vladimir Oblast, Russia. The population was 1,783 as of 2010. There are 32 streets.

Geography 
Novoye is located 2 km west of Suzdal (the district's administrative centre) by road. Suzdal is the nearest rural locality.

References 

Rural localities in Suzdalsky District
Vladimirsky Uyezd